The 1937 European Figure Skating Championships were held in Prague, Czechoslovakia. Elite senior-level figure skaters from European ISU member nations competed for the title of European Champion in the disciplines of men's singles, ladies' singles, and pair skating.

Results

Men

Ladies

Pairs

References

External links
 results

European Figure Skating Championships, 1937
European Figure Skating Championships, 1937
European Figure Skating Championships
Figure skating in Czechoslovakia
International figure skating competitions hosted by Czechoslovakia
Sports competitions in Prague
1930s in Prague